Estonian Entrepreneurship University of Applied Sciences (EUAS, formerly known in English as Mainor Business School) is a private vocational university located in the Ülemiste City business park in Tallinn, Estonia. Founded in 1992, the university offers accredited Bachelor and Master-level degrees in Estonian, English, and Russian languages, covering such fields as business administration, finance and logistics, and software and game development. It has a student body of over 1,600 students, about 100 of whom are international students.

Since 2017, EUAS has been involved in a national cross-university entrepreneurship training program funded by the Estonian Ministry of Education and Research. The university is also notable for opening Estonia's first undergraduate degree program in Information Science taught in English, primarily aimed at expats.

While primarily a teaching institution, EUAS has been actively involved in research on entrepreneurship education and applied higher education.

See also
List of universities in Estonia

References

External links
 

Business schools in Estonia
Education in Tallinn
Educational institutions established in 1992
1992 establishments in Estonia
Universities of Applied Sciences